The PHP Standard Recommendation (PSR) is a PHP specification published by the PHP Framework Interop Group. Similar to Java Specification Request for Java, it serves the standardization of programming concepts in PHP. The aim is to enable interoperability of components and to provide a common technical basis for implementation of proven concepts for optimal programming and testing practices. The PHP-FIG is formed by several PHP frameworks founders.

Each PSR is suggested by members and voted according to an established protocol to act consistently and in line with their agreed upon processes.

 

The PHP-FIG official website has the PSR documentation that follows the RFC 2119 written by Scott Bradner in March 1997 at Harvard University.

References

External links 
 PHP Framework Interop Group official website

PHP
Programming languages by peer review